In chemical nomenclature, the IUPAC nomenclature of organic chemistry is a method of naming organic chemical compounds as recommended by the International Union of Pure and Applied Chemistry (IUPAC). It is published in the Nomenclature of Organic Chemistry (informally called the Blue Book). Ideally, every possible organic compound should have a name from which an unambiguous structural formula can be created. There is also an IUPAC nomenclature of inorganic chemistry.

To avoid long and tedious names in normal communication, the official IUPAC naming recommendations are not always followed in practice, except when it is necessary to give an unambiguous and absolute definition to a compound. IUPAC names can sometimes be simpler than older names, as with ethanol, instead of ethyl alcohol. For relatively simple molecules they can be more easily understood than non-systematic names, which must be learnt or looked over. However, the common or trivial name is often substantially shorter and clearer, and so preferred. These non-systematic names are often derived from an original source of the compound. Also, very long names may be less clear than structural formulas.

Basic principles
In chemistry, a number of prefixes, suffixes and infixes are used to describe the type and position of the functional groups in the compound.

The steps for naming an organic compound are:
 Identification of the parent hydrocarbon chain. This chain must obey the following rules, in order of precedence:
 It should have the maximum number of substituents of the suffix functional group. By suffix, it is meant that the parent functional group should have a suffix, unlike halogen substituents. If more than one functional group is present, the one with highest group precedence should be used.
 It should have the maximum number of multiple bonds.
It should have the maximum length.
 It should have the maximum number of substituents or branches cited as prefixes
 It should have the maximum number of single bonds.
 Identification of the parent functional group, if any, with the highest order of precedence.
 Identification of the side-chains. Side chains are the carbon chains that are not in the parent chain, but are branched off from it.
 Identification of the remaining functional groups, if any, and naming them by their ionic prefixes (such as hydroxy for -OH, oxy for =O, oxyalkane for O-R, etc.).Different side-chains and functional groups will be grouped together in alphabetical order. (The prefixes di-, tri-, etc. are not taken into consideration for grouping alphabetically. For example, ethyl comes before dihydroxy or dimethyl, as the "e" in "ethyl" precedes the "h" in "dihydroxy" and the "m" in "dimethyl" alphabetically. The "di" is not considered in either case). When both side chains and secondary functional groups are present, they should be written mixed together in one group rather than in two separate groups.
 Identification of double/triple bonds.
 Numbering of the chain. This is done by first numbering the chain in both directions (left to right and right to left), and then choosing the numbering which follows these rules, in order of precedence.
 Has the lowest-numbered locant (or locants) for the suffix functional group. Locants are the numbers on the carbons to which the substituent is directly attached.
 Has the lowest-numbered locants for multiple bonds (The locant of a multiple bond is the number of the adjacent carbon with a lower number).
 Has the lowest-numbered locants for prefixes.
 Numbering of the various substituents and bonds with their locants. If there is more than one of the same type of substituent/double bond, a prefix is added showing how many there are (di – 2 tri – 3 tetra – 4 then as for the number of carbons below with 'a' added)

The numbers for that type of side chain will be grouped in ascending order and written before the name of the side-chain. If there are two side-chains with the same alpha carbon, the number will be written twice. Example: 2,2,3-trimethyl- . If there are both double bonds and triple bonds, "en" (double bond) is written before "yne" (triple bond). When the main functional group is a terminal functional group (a group which can exist only at the end of a chain, like formyl and carboxyl groups), there is no need to number it.

 Arrangement in this form: Group of side chains and secondary functional groups with numbers made in step 3 + prefix of parent hydrocarbon chain (eth, meth) + double/triple bonds with numbers (or "ane") + primary functional group suffix with numbers.Wherever it says "with numbers", it is understood that between the word and the numbers, the prefix (di-, tri-) is used.
 Adding of punctuation:
 Commas are put between numbers (2 5 5 becomes 2,5,5)
 Hyphens are put between a number and a letter (2 5 5 trimethylheptane becomes 2,5,5-trimethylheptane)
 Successive words are merged into one word (trimethyl heptane becomes trimethylheptane) Note: IUPAC uses one-word names throughout. This is why all parts are connected.

The resulting name appears as:
#,#-di<side chain>-#-<secondary functional group>-#-<side chain>-#,#,#-tri<secondary functional group><parent chain prefix><If all bonds are single bonds, use "ane">-#,#-di<double bonds>-#-<triple bonds>-#-<primary functional group>

where each "#" represents a number. The group secondary functional groups and side chains may not look the same as shown here, as the side chains and secondary functional groups are arranged alphabetically. The di- and tri- have been used just to show their usage. (di- after #,#, tri- after #,#,#, etc.)

Example 
Here is a sample molecule with the parent carbons numbered:

For simplicity, here is an image of the same molecule, where the hydrogens in the parent chain are removed and the carbons are shown by their numbers:

Now, following the above steps:
 The parent hydrocarbon chain has 23 carbons. It is called tricosa-.
 The functional groups with the highest precedence are the two ketone groups.
 The groups are on carbon atoms 3 and 9. As there are two, we write 3,9-dione.
 The numbering of the molecule is based on the ketone groups. When numbering from left to right, the ketone groups are numbered 3 and 9. When numbering from right to left, the ketone groups are numbered 15 and 21. 3 is less than 15, therefore the ketones are numbered 3 and 9. The smaller number is always used, not the sum of the constituents numbers.
 The side chains are: an ethyl- at carbon 4, an ethyl- at carbon 8, and a butyl- at carbon 12.
 There are two ethyl- groups. They are combined to create, 4,8-diethyl.
 The side chains are grouped like this: 12-butyl-4,8-diethyl. (But this is not necessarily the final grouping, as functional groups may be added in between to ensure all groups are listed alphabetically.)
 The secondary functional groups are: a hydroxy- at carbon 5, a chloro- at carbon 11, a methoxy- at carbon 15, and a bromo- at carbon 18. Grouped with the side chains, this gives 18-bromo-12-butyl-11-chloro-4,8-diethyl-5-hydroxy-15-methoxy.
 There are two double bonds: one between carbons 6 and 7, and one between carbons 13 and 14. They would be called "6,13-diene", but the presence of alkynes switches it to 6,13-dien. There is one triple bond between carbon atoms 19 and 20. It will be called 19-yne.
 The arrangement (with punctuation) is: 18-bromo-12-butyl-11-chloro-4,8-diethyl-5-hydroxy-15-methoxytricosa-6,13-dien-19-yne-3,9-dione
 Finally, due to cis-trans isomerism, we have to specify the relative orientation of functional groups around each double bond. For this example, both double bonds are trans isomers, so we have (6E,13E)

The final name is (6E,13E)-18-bromo-12-butyl-11-chloro-4,8-diethyl-5-hydroxy-15-methoxytricosa-6,13-dien-19-yne-3,9-dione.

Hydrocarbons

Alkanes

Straight-chain alkanes take the suffix "-ane" and are prefixed depending on the number of carbon atoms in the chain, following standard rules. The first few are:

For example, the simplest alkane is  methane, and the nine-carbon alkane  is named nonane. The names of the first four alkanes were derived from methanol, ether, propionic acid and butyric acid, respectively. The rest are named with a Greek numeric prefix, with the exceptions of nonane which has a Latin prefix, and undecane which has mixed-language prefixes.

 
Branched alkanes are named as a straight-chain alkane with attached alkyl groups. They are prefixed with a number indicating the carbon the group is attached to, counting from the end of the alkane chain. For example, commonly known as isobutane, is treated as a propane chain with a methyl group bonded to the middle (2) carbon, and given the systematic name 2-methylpropane. However, although the name 2-methylpropane could be used, it is easier and more logical to call it simply methylpropane – the methyl group could not possibly occur on any of the other carbon atoms (that would lengthen the chain and result in butane, not propane) and therefore the use of the number "2" is unnecessary.

If there is ambiguity in the position of the substituent, depending on which end of the alkane chain is counted as "1", then numbering is chosen so that the smaller number is used. For example,  (isopentane) is named 2-methylbutane, not 3-methylbutane.

If there are multiple side-branches of the same size alkyl group, their positions are separated by commas and the group prefixed with di-, tri-, tetra-, etc., depending on the number of branches. For example,  (neopentane) is named 2,2-dimethylpropane. If there are different groups, they are added in alphabetical order, separated by commas or hyphens. The longest possible main alkane chain is used; therefore 3-ethyl-4-methylhexane instead of 2,3-diethylpentane, even though these describe equivalent structures. The di-, tri- etc. prefixes are ignored for the purpose of alphabetical ordering of side chains (e.g. 3-ethyl-2,4-dimethylpentane, not 2,4-dimethyl-3-ethylpentane).

Alkenes

Alkenes are named for their parent alkane chain with the suffix "-ene" and an infixed number indicating the position of the carbon with the lower number for each double bond in the chain:  is but-1-ene.
Multiple double bonds take the form -diene, -triene, etc., with the size prefix of the chain taking an extra "a":  is buta-1,3-diene. Simple cis and trans isomers may be indicated with a prefixed cis- or trans-: cis-but-2-ene, trans-but-2-ene. However, cis- and trans- are relative descriptors. It is IUPAC convention to describe all alkenes using absolute descriptors of Z- (same side) and E- (opposite) with the Cahn–Ingold–Prelog priority rules.

Alkynes

Alkynes are named using the same system, with the suffix "-yne" indicating a triple bond: ethyne (acetylene), propyne (methylacetylene).

Functional groups

Haloalkanes and haloarenes

In Haloalkanes and Haloarenes (R-X), Halogen functional groups are prefixed with the bonding position and take the form of fluoro-, chloro-, bromo-, iodo-, etc., depending on the halogen. Multiple groups are dichloro-, trichloro-, etc., and dissimilar groups are ordered alphabetically as before. For example,  (chloroform) is trichloromethane. The anesthetic halothane is 2-bromo-2-chloro-1,1,1-trifluoroethane.

Alcohols

Alcohols (R-OH) take the suffix "-ol" with an infix numerical bonding position:  is propan-1-ol.

If higher precedence functional groups are present (see order of precedence, below), the prefix "hydroxy" is used with the bonding position:  is 2-hydroxypropanoic acid.

Ethers

Ethers (R-O-R) consist of an oxygen atom between the two attached carbon chains. The shorter of the two chains becomes the first part of the name with the -ane suffix changed to -oxy, and the longer alkane chain becomes the suffix of the name of the ether. If the oxygen is not attached to the end of the main alkane chain, then the whole shorter alkyl-plus-ether group is treated as a side-chain and prefixed with its bonding position on the main chain. Thus  is 2-methoxypropane.

Alternatively, an ether chain can be named as an alkane in which one carbon is replaced by an oxygen, a replacement denoted by the prefix "oxa". For example,  could also be called 2-oxabutane, and an epoxide could be called oxacyclopropane. This method is especially useful when both groups attached to the oxygen atom are complex.

Aldehydes

Aldehydes (R-CHO) take the suffix "-al". If other functional groups are present, the chain is numbered such that the aldehyde carbon is in the "1" position, unless functional groups of higher precedence are present.

If a prefix form is required, "oxo-" is used (as for ketones), with the position number indicating the end of a chain:  is 3-oxopropanoic acid. If the carbon in the carbonyl group cannot be included in the attached chain (for instance in the case of cyclic aldehydes), the prefix "formyl-" or the suffix "-carbaldehyde" is used:  is cyclohexanecarbaldehyde. If an aldehyde is attached to a benzene and is the main functional group, the suffix becomes benzaldehyde.

Ketones

In general ketones (R-CO-R) take the suffix "-one" (pronounced own, not won) with an infix position number:  is pentan-2-one. If a higher precedence suffix is in use, the prefix "oxo-" is used:  is 3-oxohexanal.

Carboxylic acids

In general, carboxylic acids are named with the suffix -oic acid (etymologically a back-formation from benzoic acid). As with aldehydes, the carboxyl functional group must take the "1" position on the main chain and so the locant need not be stated. For example,  (lactic acid) is named 2-hydroxypropanoic acid with no "1" stated. Some traditional names for common carboxylic acids (such as acetic acid) are in such widespread use that they are retained in IUPAC nomenclature, though systematic names like ethanoic acid are also used. Carboxylic acids attached to a benzene ring are structural analogs of benzoic acid (Ph-COOH) and are named as one of its derivatives.

If there are multiple carboxyl groups on the same parent chain, multiplying prefixes are used: Malonic acid, is systematically named propanedioic acid. Alternatively, the suffix  can be used, combined with a multiplying prefix if necessary – mellitic acid is benzenehexacarboxylic acid, for example. In the latter case, the carbon atoms in the carboxyl groups do not count as being part of the main chain, a rule that also applies to the prefix form "carboxy-".

Carboxylates

Salts of carboxylic acids are named following the usual cation-then-anion conventions used for ionic compounds in both IUPAC and common nomenclature systems. The name of the carboxylate anion is derived from that of the parent acid by replacing the "–oic acid" ending with "–oate." For example, the sodium salt of benzoic acid, is called sodium benzoate.  Where an acid has both a systematic and a common name (like , for example, which is known as both acetic acid and as ethanoic acid), its salts can be named from either parent name.  Thus,  can be named as potassium acetate or as potassium ethanoate.

Esters

Esters (R-CO-O-R') are named as alkyl derivatives of carboxylic acids. The alkyl (R') group is named first. The R-CO-O part is then named as a separate word based on the carboxylic acid name, with the ending changed from -oic acid to -oate. For esters such as ethyl acetate, ethyl formate or dimethyl phthalate that are based on common acids, IUPAC recommends use of these established names, called retained names. The -oate changes to -ate. Some simple examples, named both ways, are shown in the figure above.

If the alkyl group is not attached at the end of the chain, the bond position to the ester group is infixed before "-yl":  may be called butan-2-yl propanoate or butan-2-yl propionate.

Acyl groups

Acyl groups are named by stripping the -ic acid of the corresponding carboxylic acid and replacing it with -yl. For Example, CH3CO-R is called Ethanoyl-R.

Acyl halides

	

Simply add the name of the attached halide to the end of the acyl group. For example, CH3COCl is ethanoyl chloride.

Acid anhydrides

	

Acid anhydrides (R-CO-O-OC-R) have two acyl groups linked by an oxygen atom. If both acyl groups are the same, then the name of the carboxylic acid with the word acid is replaced with the word anhydride and the IUPAC name consists of two words. If the acyl groups are different, then they are named in alphabetical order in the same way, with anhydride replacing acid and IUPAC name consists of three words.

Amines

Amines are named for the attached alkane chain with the suffix "-amine" (e.g.,  methanamine). If necessary, the bonding position is infixed:  propan-1-amine,  propan-2-amine. The prefix form is "amino-".

For secondary amines (of the form R-NH-R), the longest carbon chain attached to the nitrogen atom becomes the primary name of the amine; the other chain is prefixed as an alkyl group with location prefix given as an italic N:  is N-methylethanamine. Tertiary amines are treated similarly:  is N-ethyl-N-methylpropanamine. Again, the substituent groups are ordered alphabetically.

Amides

Amides take the suffix "-amide", or "-carboxamide" if the carbon in the amide group cannot be included in the main chain. The prefix form is both "carbamoyl-" and "amido-", e.g.,  methanamide,  ethanamide.

Amides that have additional substituents on the nitrogen are treated similarly to the case of amines: they are ordered alphabetically with the location prefix N:  is N,N-dimethylmethanamide,  is N,N-dimethylethanamide.

Nitriles

Nitriles (RCN) are named by adding the suffix -nitrile to the longest hydrocarbon chain (including the carbon of the cyano group). It can also be named by replacing the -oic acid of their corresponding carboxylic acids with -onitrile. Functional class IUPAC nomenclature may also be used in the form of alkyl cyanides. For example, CH3CH2CH2CH2C#N is called pentanenitrile or butyl cyanide.

Cyclic compounds

Cycloalkanes and aromatic compounds can be treated as the main parent chain of the compound, in which case the positions of substituents are numbered around the ring structure. For example, the three isomers of xylene , commonly the ortho-, meta-, and para- forms, are 1,2-dimethylbenzene, 1,3-dimethylbenzene, and 1,4-dimethylbenzene. The cyclic structures can also be treated as functional groups themselves, in which case they take the prefix "cycloalkyl-" (e.g. "cyclohexyl-") or for benzene, "phenyl-".

The IUPAC nomenclature scheme becomes rapidly more elaborate for more complex cyclic structures, with notation for compounds containing conjoined rings, and many common names such as phenol being accepted as base names for compounds derived from them.

Order of precedence of group
When compounds contain more than one functional group, the order of precedence determines which groups are named with prefix or suffix forms. The table below shows common groups in decreasing order of precedence. The highest-precedence group takes the suffix, with all others taking the prefix form. However, double and triple bonds only take suffix form (-en and -yn) and are used with other suffixes.

Prefixed substituents are ordered alphabetically (excluding any modifiers such as di-, tri-, etc.), e.g. chlorofluoromethane, not fluorochloromethane. If there are multiple functional groups of the same type, either prefixed or suffixed, the position numbers are ordered numerically (thus ethane-1,2-diol, not ethane-2,1-diol.) The N position indicator for amines and amides comes before "1", e.g.,  is N,2-dimethylpropanamine.

*Note: These suffixes, in which the carbon atom is counted as part of the preceding chain, are the most commonly used. See individual functional group articles for more details.

The order of remaining functional groups is only needed for substituted benzene and hence is not mentioned here.

Common nomenclature – trivial names
Common nomenclature uses the older names for some organic compounds instead of using the prefixes for the carbon skeleton above. The pattern can be seen below.

Ketones
Common names for ketones can be derived by naming the two alkyl or aryl groups bonded to the carbonyl group as separate words followed by the word ketone.
Acetone
Acetophenone
Benzophenone
Ethyl isopropyl ketone
Diethyl ketone

The first three of the names shown above are still considered to be acceptable IUPAC names.

Aldehydes
The common name for an aldehyde is derived from the common name of the corresponding carboxylic acid by dropping the word acid and changing the suffix from -ic or -oic to -aldehyde.
Formaldehyde
Acetaldehyde

Ions
The IUPAC nomenclature also provides rules for naming ions.

Hydron
Hydron is a generic term for hydrogen cation; protons, deuterons and tritons are all hydrons.
The hydrons are not found in heavier isotopes, however.

Parent hydride cations

Simple cations formed by adding a hydron to a hydride of a halogen, chalcogen or pnictogen are named by adding the suffix "-onium" to the element's root: H4N+ is ammonium, H3O+ is oxonium, and H2F+ is fluoronium. Ammonium was adopted instead of nitronium, which commonly refers to NO2+.

If the cationic center of the hydride is not a halogen, chalcogen or pnictogen then the suffix "-ium" is added to the name of the neutral hydride after dropping any final 'e'. H5C+ is methanium, HO-(O+)-H2 is dioxidanium (HO-OH is dioxidane), and H2N-(N+)-H3 is diazanium (H2N-NH2 is diazane).

Cations and substitution
The above cations except for methanium are not, strictly speaking, organic, since they do not contain carbon. However, many organic cations are obtained by substituting another element or some functional group for a hydrogen.

The name of each substitution is prefixed to the hydride cation name. If many substitutions by the same functional group occur, then the number is indicated by prefixing with "di-", "tri-" as with halogenation. (CH3)3O+ is trimethyloxonium. CH3F3N+ is trifluoromethylammonium.

See also

Descriptor (chemistry)
Hantzsch–Widman nomenclature
International Union of Biochemistry and Molecular Biology
Nucleic acid notation
Organic nomenclature in Chinese
Phanes
Preferred IUPAC name
Von Baeyer nomenclature
IUPAC nomenclature of inorganic chemistry

References

Bibliography

External links
IUPAC Nomenclature of Organic Chemistry (online version of several older editions of the IUPAC Blue Book)
IUPAC Recommendations on Organic & Biochemical Nomenclature, Symbols, Terminology, etc. (includes IUBMB Recommendations for biochemistry)
Bibliography of IUPAC Recommendations on Organic Nomenclature (last updated 11 April 2003)
ACD/Name Software for generating systematic nomenclature
ChemAxon Name <> Structure – ChemAxon IUPAC (& traditional) name to structure and structure to IUPAC name software. As used at chemicalize.org
chemicalize.org A free web site/service that extracts IUPAC names from web pages and annotates a 'chemicalized' version with structure images. Structures from annotated pages can also be searched.

American Chemical Society, Committee on Nomenclature, Terminology & Symbols

Chemical nomenclature
Encodings
Organic chemistry